Huachipaeri or Wacipairi may refer to:
 Huachipaeri people, an ethnic group of Peru
 Huachipaeri language, a language of Peru